David Hudson (August 23, 1782 Dutchess County, New York - January 12, 1860 Geneva, Ontario County, New York) was an American lawyer, writer and politician from New York.

Life
He was the son of Asa Hudson (b. 1749) and Mary (Scott) Hudson (1752–1825). On January 16, 1816, he married Hester (Hetty) Schuyler Dey (1792–1863).

In 1821, he published a History of Jemima Wilkinson (on-line version), a hostile and inaccurate biography of the Public Universal Friend, written to influence a then-ongoing court case over land owned by the Society of Universal Friends.

He was a Whig member from Ontario County of the New York State Assembly in 1838. In 1840, he was elected a canal commissioner, and remained in office until 1842.

He, his wife, and three of their children who died in infancy were buried at Pulteney Street Cemetery in Geneva, NY.

Sources
 Death notice in Ontario Messenger on January 25, 1860 (gives January 13 as death date)
 Burial record (gives January 12 as death date)
 Family tree (gives January 13 as death date)
The History of the Treman, Tremaine, Truman Family in America: With the Related Families of Mack, Dey, Board and Ayers by Ebenezer Mack Treman & Murray Edward Poole (Press of the Ithaca Democrat, 1901) [gives January 12 as death date]
The New York Civil List compiled by Franklin Benjamin Hough (pages 42, 222 and 282; Weed, Parsons and Co., 1858)

1782 births
1860 deaths
Politicians from Geneva, New York
Erie Canal Commissioners
Members of the New York State Assembly
People from Dutchess County, New York
New York (state) Whigs
19th-century American politicians